Google Marketing Platform is an online advertising and analytics platform developed by Google and launched on July 24, 2018. It unifies DoubleClick's advertising services (acquired in March 2008) and Google's own advertising and analytics services. Google Marketing Platform is mainly used by big advertisers to buy ads on Internet.

Google Ads (launched in 2000) and Google Ad Manager (launched in 2010) are not parts of Google Marketing Platform. The three brands are complementary tools targeting different types of ad buyers and presenting slightly different features. However, the addition of Google Marketing Platform to Google's previous offers causes a lot of confusion for people looking to buy ads via Google.

Services

Google Marketing Platform includes the following services:

 Display & Video 360 (demand-side platform)
 Search Ads 360 (search advertising)
 Campaign Manager 360 (ad management and measurement)
 Google Analytics (web analytics)
 Google Tag Manager (tag management)
 Google Optimize (web analytics)
 Looker Studio, formerly Google Data Studio (web analytics)
 Google Surveys (market research)

References

External links
 

Marketing Platform
Digital marketing
Web analytics